Wild Horse is an unincorporated community in southern Alberta within Cypress County, Canada on the Canada–United States border.

Wild Horse also serves as a port of entry into the U.S. state of Montana as it is located at a border crossing with the United States, where Highway 41 meets Montana Secondary Highway 232. The Canada Border Services Agency office 711 is located here. On the other side of the border is Hill County, Montana.

See also 
 Wild Horse Border Crossing

References 

Alberta land ports of entry
Localities in Cypress County